The stripe-tailed yellow finch (Sicalis citrina) is a species of bird in the family Thraupidae.
It is found in Argentina, Bolivia, Brazil, Colombia, Guyana, Paraguay, Peru, Suriname, and Venezuela.
Its natural habitats are dry savanna and pastureland.

References

External links
"Stripe-tailed Yellow-Finch" photo gallery VIREO

stripe-tailed yellow finch
Birds of the Sierra Nevada de Santa Marta
Birds of the Venezuelan Coastal Range
Birds of Venezuela
Birds of the Cerrado
Birds of the Yungas
stripe-tailed yellow finch
Taxonomy articles created by Polbot